España Boulevard is an eight–lane major thoroughfare in Manila, the capital city of the Philippines, named after Spain, the country that formerly held the Philippines as an overseas territory. True to its name, several Spanish names abound the street. It starts at the Welcome Rotonda near the boundary of Quezon City and Manila and ends with a Y-intersection with Lerma and Nicanor Reyes Streets in Manila.

History

Before becoming what it is today, the boulevard was a part of the Hacienda de Sulucan, one of the ten barrios which formed Sampaloc. In 1694, the hacienda was donated to the sisters of the Monasterio de Santa Clara. In 1905, it was turned over to the Sulucan Development Corporation. The road was constructed in 1913 as an access road to Sulucan, under the condition that it be named "España".

As a part of the national road plan to connect the government center of Manila in Rizal Park to the proposed new capital on the Diliman estate, the boulevard was once part of or also known as Quezon Boulevard.

Notable landmarks

España is an east–west artery of Manila. It connects Lerma and Nicanor Reyes (formerly Morayta) streets of Sampaloc district at the west end to the Mabuhay (or Welcome) Rotonda, Quezon City at the east end. The entire street is straddled by a center island, which is only broken at major intersections and at the railroad crossing. Vehicles are allowed to make a left-turn only on two intersections: southward to Lacson Avenue and at the western terminus going to Nicanor Reyes Street. España is two kilometers long.

España's north side is its west-bound (Manila-bound) side, while the south side is its east-bound (Quezon City-bound) side. Buses, taxis, jeepneys, cabriolets, and UV Express vehicles serve the commuters.

Quezon City
At the eastern terminus is the Welcome Rotonda, also called the Mabuhay Rotonda, which connects España with Quezon Avenue, Eulogio Rodriguez, Sr. Avenue, and Mayon. Quezon Avenue leads to EDSA and ultimately to the Quezon Memorial Circle. E. Rodriguez, Sr. Avenue leads to Cubao district of Quezon City, a popular shopping place. Mayon leads to A. Bonifacio Avenue and ultimately to the North Luzon Expressway.

Manila
The first major intersection is Blumentritt Road. The Philippine National Railways tracks crosses the boulevard between Antipolo and Algeciras streets. The España railway station is also located here. Between Lacson Avenue and Padre Noval Street is the main campus of the University of Santo Tomas.

España ends at the junction of Nicanor Reyes (formerly called Morayta) and Lerma Streets. Nicanor Reyes Street leads to Claro M. Recto Avenue while Lerma Street, on the other hand, leads to Quezon Boulevard.

Notable events
España is infamous for its floods during the rainy season. This is because it serves as a catch basin for runoff water from higher elevated Quezon City, as Sampaloc used to be a swamp-marsh area. It is common to find people wading in waist-deep floods especially when a typhoon passes through Manila, causing suspension of classes.

On August 31, 1983, Marcos opposition figure and former senator Benigno Aquino Jr.'s funeral procession passed through España on its way to Manila Memorial Park in Parañaque from Santo Domingo Church in Quezon City. It was joined by millions of Filipinos. Fernando Poe, Jr.'s funeral procession also passed through España on its way to Manila North Cemetery from the same church on December 22, 2004. As many 3 million people took part in the procession.

A new mass-transit line has been planned several times to cross España, the first one being called as MRT-4, also called by some as the Red Line. The said MRT line will traverse the Boulevard until it reaches San Jose del Monte City, Bulacan which has been shelved in favor of MRT-7 line that diverted and cut short the terminus at North Avenue. After the MRT-7 proposal was awarded, the plans were revived to create a separate line for the remainder of the alignment from the original MRT-4 proposal that the MRT-7 left out which was named MRT-9 that was envisioned to traverse from Lerma to North Avenue. Subsequently, this was again shelved in favor of a BRT line that traverses from Lerma to UP Diliman but was again shelved now in favor of an unsolicited proposal put up by PNR and Alloy MTD using the same remaining MRT-4 and BRT alignment with the working project name "PNR East-West Rail" and is believed to be officially numbered Line 8, should the proposal push through.

The boulevard will also provide access to the under-construction NLEX Connector (NLEX–SLEX Connector Road) via España Exit. The said extension will traverse over the Philippine National Railway (PNR) tracks from NLEX Harbor Link in Caloocan up to Skyway in Manila.

The house of the longest serving Mayor of Manila, Ramon Bagatsing, is in Kundiman Street, on the boulevard's north side. Many people used to flock to his residence as it was open to all his constituents, becoming the de facto public service assistance center for Manila's poor and underprivileged. Today, the Bagatsing compound extends all the way to the parallel street of Craig.

España is also frequently used by anti-government protesters as a gathering area due to its proximity to Mendiola, which ends at Malacañan Palace, the presidential residence.

Intersections

Landmarks 
From east to west:

 Sun Residences
 United Doctors Medical Center
 Espaňa station
 Ramon Magsaysay High School, Manila
 University of Santo Tomas

References

University of Santo Tomas
Streets in Manila
Boulevards
Sampaloc, Manila